Pólko may refer to the following places:
Pólko, Kuyavian-Pomeranian Voivodeship (north-central Poland)
Pólko, Biała Podlaska County in Lublin Voivodeship (east Poland)
Pólko, Gmina Michałowo in Podlaskie Voivodeship (north-east Poland)
Pólko, Gmina Supraśl in Podlaskie Voivodeship (north-east Poland)
Pólko, Lublin County in Lublin Voivodeship (east Poland)
Pólko, Piaseczno County in Masovian Voivodeship (east-central Poland)
Pólko, Gmina Stawiszyn in Greater Poland Voivodeship (west-central Poland)
Pólko, Gmina Żelazków in Greater Poland Voivodeship (west-central Poland)
Pólko, Międzychód County in Greater Poland Voivodeship (west-central Poland)
Pólko, Szamotuły County in Greater Poland Voivodeship (west-central Poland)
Pólko, Lubusz Voivodeship (west Poland)
Pólko, Kwidzyn County in Pomeranian Voivodeship (north Poland)
Pólko, Starogard County in Pomeranian Voivodeship (north Poland)
Pólko, Warmian-Masurian Voivodeship (north Poland)